Sarfraz Alam is an Indian politician who represented the Araria seat of Bihar in the Indian Parliament as a candidate of Rashtriya Janata Dal from 2018 to 2019.

Personal life
Alam is the son of Mohammed Taslimuddin, who was a member of Rashtriya Janata Dal and an MP from the Araria seat. He has 7 children with his wife Begum Shania.

Career
Alam had been elected to the Bihar Legislative Assembly (from Jokihat seat) for four terms (1996, 2000, 2010, 2015) - first and second term as a candidate of Rashtriya Janata Dal, and the next two as a candidate of Janata Dal (United). In January 2016, he was suspended by his party after a FIR was lodged against him for allegedly misbehaving with a couple in a train.

In February 2018, Alam rejoined Rashtriya Janata Dal. He said that Bihar Chief Minister Nitish Kumar had betrayed secular forces by breaking the Mahagathbandhan alliance and allying with Bharatiya Janata Party. Subsequently, he was nominated by the party to contest the Parliamentary bypoll for the seat of Araria (vacated due to the death of sitting MP Mohammed Taslimuddin). He won the election, held in March by a margin of 61 thousand votes.

References

Bihar MLAs 2010–2015
People from Araria district
Living people
Rashtriya Janata Dal politicians
India MPs 2014–2019
Year of birth missing (living people)
Janata Dal (United) politicians